Mlinište may refer to the following places:

Mlinište (Mrkonjić Grad), village in the municipality of Mrkonjić Grad, Bosnia and Herzegovina
Mlinište, Croatia, village in the municipality of Zažablje, Croatia